"Familiar Feeling" is a song by English-Irish electronica duo Moloko. It was released on 17 February 2003 as the lead single from their fourth and final studio album Statues. The song peaked at number 10 on the UK Singles Chart and number nine in Portugal.

Track listings
UK 12-inch single
"Familiar Feeling" (Radio Edit) — 3:44
"Familiar Feeling" (Max Reich Vocal Mix Edit) — 5:05
"Familiar Feeling" (Timo Maas Main Mix Edit) — 4:02
"Familiar Feeling" (Robbie Rivera's Dark & Sexy Mix Edit) — 5:11

UK, European, and Australian CD single
"Familiar Feeling" (Radio Edit) — 3:44
"Familiar Feeling" (Timo Maas Main Mix Edit) — 4:02
"Familiar Feeling" (Martin Buttrich Remix Edit) — 4:47
"Familiar Feeling" (Max Reich Vocal Mix Edit) — 5:05
"Familiar Feeling" (Video) — 3:55

Digital download
"Familiar Feeling" (Radio Edit) — 3:45
"Familiar Feeling" (Timo Maas Main Mix Edit) — 4:02
"Familiar Feeling" (Martin Buttrich Remix Edit) — 4:47
"Familiar Feeling" (Max Reich Vocal Mix Edit) — 5:07

Charts

References

2002 songs
2003 singles
The Echo Label singles
Moloko songs
Songs written by Mark Brydon
Songs written by Róisín Murphy